In Greek mythology, Thamyris (Ancient Greek: Θάμυρις, Thámuris) was a Thracian singer. He is notable in Greek mythology for reportedly being a lover of Hyacinth and thus to have been the first male to have loved another male, but when his songs failed to win his love from the god Apollo, he challenged the Nine Muses to a competition and lost.

Family 
Thamyris was the son of Philammon and the nymph Argiope from Mount Parnassus. One account makes him the father of Menippe who became the mother of Orpheus by Oeagrus.

Mythology

Early years 
When Philammon refused to take Argiope into his house as his wife, the girl left Peloponnese and went to the country of the Odrysians in Thrace where she gave birth to a son, Thamyris. When the boy reached puberty, he became so accomplished in singing to the cithara that the Scythians made him their king even though he was an interloper.

Contest with Muses 
Thamyris boasted at the ford of the river Alpheus while returning from Oechalia that he could surpass the Muses in singing, the daughters of Zeus.  But they were angry and stilled his singing forever, maiming him and robbing him of his divine power of song, and he could not play the lyre anymore. The outline of this story is told in the Iliad. According to Apollodorus, the Muses punished him by gouging out his eyes.

This allusion is taken up in Euripides' Rhesus, in the Library attributed to Apollodorus, and in the scholia on the Iliad. These later sources add the details that Thamyris had claimed as his prize, if he should win the contest, the privilege of having sex with all the Muses (according to one version) or of marrying one of them; and that after his death he was further punished in Hades. The story legendarily demonstrates that poetic inspiration, a gift of the gods, can be taken away by the gods.

According to Diodorus the mythical singer Linus took three pupils: Heracles, Thamyris, and Orpheus, which neatly settles Thamyris' legendary chronology. When Pliny the Elder briefly sketches the origins of music he credits Thamyris with inventing the Dorian mode and with being the first to play the cithara as a solo instrument with no voice accompaniment.

Thamyris is said to have been a lover of Hyacinth and thus to have been the first man to have loved another male.

Other
Thamyris is also the name of a Theban who was killed by Actor.

Legacy 
Thamyris Glacier on Anvers Island in Antarctica is named after Thamyris.

Notes

References 

 Conon, Fifty Narrations, surviving as one-paragraph summaries in the Bibliotheca (Library) of Photius, Patriarch of Constantinople translated from the Greek by Brady Kiesling. Online version at the Topos Text Project.
 Diodorus Siculus, The Library of History translated by Charles Henry Oldfather. Twelve volumes. Loeb Classical Library. Cambridge, Massachusetts: Harvard University Press; London: William Heinemann, Ltd. 1989. Vol. 3. Books 4.59–8. Online version at Bill Thayer's Web Site
 Diodorus Siculus, Bibliotheca Historica. Vol 1-2. Immanel Bekker. Ludwig Dindorf. Friedrich Vogel. in aedibus B. G. Teubneri. Leipzig. 1888-1890. Greek text available at the Perseus Digital Library.
 Homer, The Iliad with an English Translation by A.T. Murray, Ph.D. in two volumes. Cambridge, MA., Harvard University Press; London, William Heinemann, Ltd. 1924. . Online version at the Perseus Digital Library.
 Homer, Homeri Opera in five volumes. Oxford, Oxford University Press. 1920. . Greek text available at the Perseus Digital Library.
 John Tzetzes, Book of Histories, Book I translated by Ana Untila from the original Greek of T. Kiessling's edition of 1826.  Online version at theoi.com
 Pausanias, Description of Greece with an English Translation by W.H.S. Jones, Litt.D., and H.A. Ormerod, M.A., in 4 Volumes. Cambridge, MA, Harvard University Press; London, William Heinemann Ltd. 1918. . Online version at the Perseus Digital Library
 Pausanias, Graeciae Descriptio. 3 vols. Leipzig, Teubner. 1903.  Greek text available at the Perseus Digital Library.
 Pliny the Elder, The Natural History. John Bostock, M.D., F.R.S. H.T. Riley, Esq., B.A. London. Taylor and Francis, Red Lion Court, Fleet Street. 1855. Online version at the Perseus Digital Library.
 Pliny the Elder, Naturalis Historia. Karl Friedrich Theodor Mayhoff. Lipsiae. Teubner. 1906. Latin text available at the Perseus Digital Library.
 Pseudo-Apollodorus, The Library with an English Translation by Sir James George Frazer, F.B.A., F.R.S. in 2 Volumes, Cambridge, MA, Harvard University Press; London, William Heinemann Ltd. 1921. . Online version at the Perseus Digital Library. Greek text available from the same website.

External links 
 Donatella Restani, "Music and myth in ancient Greece" with literary references to Thamyris

Oral poets
Musicians in Greek mythology
Characters in Greek mythology
Greek mythology of Thrace
LGBT themes in Greek mythology
Mythological blind people